Toasted TV is an Australian children's television program which aired on Network 10 and later 10 Peach from 22 August 2005 to 18 September 2020.

Toasted TV replaced similar children's program Cheez TV in the same timeslot. The series originally aired on Network 10 until 25 February 2012, when it moved to 10 Peach (then known as Eleven). It was originally presented by Pip Russell and Dan Sweetman, with the final hosts Ollie McCormack and Lia Walsh.

On 13 July 2020, Network 10 announced that Toasted TV has been axed and that the show would end production in August; the final episode aired on 18 September 2020.

Hosts

Format 
The show targeted an audience of 7- to 14-year-olds. The activities of the hosts are interspersed with cartoons and anime, such as Pokémon, Avatar: The Last Airbender, Beyblade: Metal Fusion, SpongeBob SquarePants, Yu-Gi-Oh! GX (Yu-Gi-Oh! Duel Monsters GX), The Penguins of Madagascar, and Bakugan.

Premiering on 22 August 2005, it succeeded Cheez TV, and is produced in conjunction with Village Roadshow Theme Parks, the owner of Warner Bros. Movie World, Sea World and Wet'n'Wild Water World. On 13 July 2011 to show changed to filming at Dreamworld. As of 2 July 2012, the show is shot in a studio.

Regular segments on Toasted TV included:

Letter of the Week, where letters are read and prizes are given out for them. This segment used to show on Saturdays and now shows on a weekday.
Facebook Watch, a segment where Ollie and Lia read out a topic they have posted on Facebook and the viewers replies or the posts on their Facebook feed.
The Week That Was where every Friday, recaps of the week are shown from Sunday to Thursday.

Former segments on Toasted TV included:

Appearances by a wide range of guests from sportstars to artists and celebrities.
Bike Wheel of Misfortune, where the bike wheel is spun and the hosts have to do one of the many double dares that have been sent in. The Bike Wheel of Misfortune has five categories of double dare: Physical Challenge, Face Off (Kell vs Seamus), On Your Head, Wild Card, and Down Your Pants. The most popular is "Down Your Pants". This segment was showing on Saturdays.
Brain Squeeze, the world's dodgiest quiz show, where contestants played for Wahu items. Used to be hosted by Pip and Dan.
Bread Board, where viewers send in a question about a situation and the board consisting of at least four kids try to solve the problem.
Chuck It In. This is one of the most popular segments on the show. People send in their gross recipes and Kellyn and Palmer mix them in a blender and then have to drink it. This segment was showing on Saturdays.
Delson Asprin, portrayed by Palmer who brings in the latest scoop from Hollywood. No longer happening due to him leaving the show.
E Toasted, a segment that is a parody of Entertainment Tonight.
Game Roadtest where Kellyn and Seamus test out new games that are yet to be released in Australia.
Get Active Time, where a countdown timer appears every Wednesday and when it gets to zero, the hosts partake in a short exercise routine. Used to be hosted by Pip and Dan and later hosted by exercise instructor "Frizzie". portrayed by Pip who was a parody of foreign fitness instructors.
Nelson Asprin, portrayed by Dan who brings in the latest scoop from Hollywood. Replaced by Delson Asprin and revealed his true identity on his final appearance on Toasted TV.
Song on the Spot, where random people in Movie World say a word for Pip and Dan to make up a song using the selected words. No longer around, since Dan did the playing and left the show.
Toasted TV Rise and Shine Today, where Pip Russell and Dan Sweetman do various random news reports. Parody of Channel Seven's Sunrise with David and Mel. Replaced by "E Toasted".
Vicky Schmeckham, portrayed by Kellyn who brings in the latest music news from London. A parody of Victoria Beckham who Schmeckham points out she is not related to.

History

 On Friday, 4 July 2008, it was announced that Pip Russell would be leaving Toasted TV for Totally Wild, Network Ten's wildlife program for kids.
 On Thursday, 10 July 2008, it was revealed that the new female co-host is Kellyn Morris from Puzzle Play.
 On Friday, 11 July 2008, this was Pip's last episode ever on Toasted TV.
 On Saturday, 12 July 2008, since Pip left the show and Kellyn didn't start hosting, Dan was hosting the show solo on that day.
 On Monday, 14 July 2008, Kellyn started co-hosting Toasted TV.
 On Friday, 18 July 2008, near the end of the show, host Dan Sweetman revealed that he would be leaving the show within four weeks. It was revealed that four candidates are up for the job with the audience having the vote for the new co-host.
 On Tuesday, 26 August 2008, it was revealed that the new co-host is Palmer Marchese, the same day Dan Sweetman left the show.
 On Wednesday, 27 August 2008, Palmer started co-hosting Toasted TV.
 On Saturday, 30 August 2008, Dan temporarily co-hosted Toasted TV since Kellyn wasn't present in that episode.
 On Thursday, 23 October 2008, Toasted TV aired its 1,000th episode.
 On Friday, 31 October 2008, not only was the Pokémon Mystery Dungeon: Explorers of Time & Darkness special shown at 7:30, special guest Pikachu made an appearance on this episode.
 From Thursday, 13 November 2008 until Tuesday, 18 November 2008, Toasted TV went to Wet'n'Wild. Except for Monday, where they do their "Outback Monday" segment.
 On Tuesday, 30 December 2008, Toasted TV announced that Saturday's edition Toasted TV will air from 6:00 am to 8:30 am, 90 minutes longer than usual.
 From Monday, 5 January 2009 till Wednesday, 7 January 2009, Palmer wasn't present in these episodes. As a result, Kellyn had to host Toasted TV on her own.
 On Thursday, 8 January 2009, Brain Squeeze "Family Fraud" returned to the segment where Kellyn's family was against Palmer's family. Palmer won in a rock, paper, scissors contest, despite the normal Brain Squeeze's final round was rock, paper, anything.
 From Tuesday, 13 January 2009 to Wednesday, 14 January 2009, Kellyn wasn't present in these episodes due to laryngitis. As a result, Palmer had to host Toasted TV on his own. When Kellyn came back, she made a comment that she wanted to go snorkeling when Palmer did it.
 On Thursday, 15 January 2009, not only did Kellyn return, Toasted TV went behind the scenes for the first time. Pip Russell made a cameo appearance saying "I miss you" when Palmer introduced people in the HQ.
 On Thursday, 29 January 2009, this is the very first time Vicky Schmeckham makes an appearance, talking about the latest music on the charts.
 On Monday, 9 February 2009, not only was the fourth series premier of Scope aired, Dr Rob and Julia appeared on the show as well. They also did the famous Diet Coke and Mentos experiment on the show.
 On Tuesday, 10 February 2009 and Wednesday, 11 February 2009, not only was the new series of Totally Wild aired, Sean from Totally Wild made an appearance in the show. Celebrity Bike Wheel of Misfortune was played and landed on Kell and Palmer vs Celebrity. Kell and Palmer won.
 On Saturday, 14 February 2009, the very first Mega Saturday was shown. Spider-Man was on at 7:30-7:45 with the remaining fifteen minutes showing Kell and Palmer playing with rays. Chuck It In and Bike Wheel of Misfortune was aired together for the first time.
 From Tuesday, 24 February 2009, Palmer Marchese was on holidays. Sean Kennedy from Totally Wild filled in for him.
 On Tuesday, 10 March 2009, Victoria Schmeckham (portrayed by Kellyn Morris) announced that "Palmer has decided to leave the Toaster to pursue a big, massive acting career!". As a result, Sean Kennedy is officially the new co-host of Toasted TV.
 On Monday, 30 March 2009, at Wet 'n' Wild Water World, Dan Sweetman returned as a special guest.
 On Thursday, 16 April 2009, during E Toasted, Natalie Hunter from Totally Wild interviewed Zac Efron about his new movie 17 Again and asked him questions that were sent in by viewers.
 On Saturday, 18 April 2009, it was announced that Sean Kennedy will be leaving Toasted TV and a new co-host will take over.
 On Monday, 20 April 2009, the new Bike Wheel of Misfortune was displayed. This time, "Physical Challenge" is replaced with "Can You Feel It?" where the hosts are blindfolded and have to touch something gross. Also, "Face Off" is replaced with "Kell vs ?".
 On Thursday, 23 April 2009, Victoria Schmeckham (portrayed by Kellyn Morris) announced the new male co-host of Toasted TV is Seamus Evans. He also appeared with Kellyn and Sean in this episode.
 On Tuesday, 15 June 2010, Toasted TV celebrated 1,500 episodes.
 On Monday, 14 March 2011, Kellyn and Seamus returned along with their 'Toaster Coaster' (a RV) to present an On the Road series traveling across Australia.
 On Monday, 27 February 2012, Toasted TV moved to Ten's digital channel Eleven (now 10 Peach) every Monday to Friday at 6am to 9am.
 On Saturday, 3 March 2012, Toasted TV celebrated 2,000 episodes.
 On Friday, 31 March 2013, Toasted TV celebrated 2,250 episodes.
 On Sunday, 9 February 2014, Toasted TV celebrated 2,500 episodes.
 On Wednesday, 15 July 2015, Toasted TV celebrated 3,000 episodes.
 On Monday, 12 November 2017, Michaela Cook (Micks) hosted and performed on Toasted TV as their Music Monday guest.
 On Tuesday, 10 April 2018, Toasted TV celebrated 4,000 episodes.
 On Saturday, 10 November 2018, Toasted TV aired a Special Saturday Preview.
 On Saturday, 27 July 2019, Elly Awesome presented her final show and was replaced on Sunday, 18 August 2019 by Lia Walsh after a few weeks of stand-in presenters.
 On Friday, 18 September 2020, Toasted TV aired the final show after 15 years.

Programming
The following is a complete list of cartoons which have premiered on Toasted TV or aired new episodes on Toasted TV. Shows listed according to the era of their premiere.

Network Ten (2005–2012)

Shows

The Adventures of Jimmy Neutron: Boy Genius
Alien Racers
All Grown Up!
Avatar: The Last Airbender
Bakugan Battle Brawlers
Bakugan: Gundalian Invaders
Bakugan: Mechtanium Surge
Bakugan: New Vestroia
Beyblade: Metal Fusion
Beyblade: Metal Masters
Biker Mice from Mars
Bratz
Chaotic
Code Lyoko
Digimon Frontier
Dinosaur King
Dork Hunters from Outer Space
Dragon Ball GT
Eon Kid
Gadget and the Gadgetinis
GoGoRiki
Gormiti: The Lords of Nature Return
Hero: 108
Horseland
Hot Wheels Battle Force 5
Huntik: Secrets & Seekers
iCarly
Kaput and Zösky
Legend of the Dragon
Mew Mew Power
My Life as a Teenage Robot
Naruto
Ojamajo Doremi
One Piece
The Penguins of Madagascar (Moved to ABC ME)
Pet Alien
Pokémon (Moved to 9Go!)
Pokémon: Advanced Battle
Pokémon: Battle Frontier
Pokémon: Diamond and Pearl
Pokémon: Diamond and Pearl: Battle Dimension
Pokémon: Diamond and Pearl: Galactic Battles
Pokémon: Diamond and Pearl: Sinnoh League Victors
Pokémon: Black & White
RollBots
Rugrats 
The Spectacular Spider-Man
SpongeBob SquarePants
Stuart Little: The Animated Series
Teenage Mutant Ninja Turtles
Teenage Mutant Ninja Turtles - Back to the Sewer
Teenage Mutant Ninja Turtles - Fast Forward
Teenage Mutant Ninja Turtles - The Lost Episodes
Totally Spies!
Transformers Animated
Transformers: Cybertron
Trollz
Victorious
Viva Piñata
Winx Club
Yu-Gi-Oh! 5D's
Yu-Gi-Oh! GX
Zorro: Generation Z

Movies and specials

Pokémon: Arceus and the Jewel of Life 
Pokémon: Giratina and the Sky Warrior 
Pokémon Mystery Dungeon: Explorers of Time and Explorers of Darkness Pokémon Mystery Dungeon: Team Go-Getters Out of the Gate! Pokémon: The Mastermind of Mirage Pokémon Pokémon: The Rise of Darkrai Tamagotchi: The MovieEleven (2012–2018) / 10 Peach (2018–2020)
ShowsThe Adventures of Chuck and FriendsThe Amazing Spiez! GGO FootballB-Daman CrossfireBarbie: Life in the DreamhouseThe Barefoot Bandits (Teletoon, Nickelodeon and DHX Media Canadian dub with Canadian voices)Beyblade: Metal FuryBeyblade: Shogun SteelBeyWarriors: BeyRaiderzBeyWheelzBlazing Team: Masters of Yo Kwon DoBob the Builder (2015 TV series)Buzzy Bee and FriendsCardfight!! Vanguard (2018 series)Cardfight!! Vanguard GCardfight!! Vanguard G: GIRS CrisisCardfight!! Vanguard G: Stride GateCardfight!! Vanguard G: NEXTCare Bears: Welcome to Care-a-LotCare Bears and CousinsClue (mini-series)DinofrozDinosaur Train (Moved to ABC Kids)DofusThe DrakersThe Fairly OddParentsGeronimo StiltonGet AceGormiti Nature UnleashedHanazuki: Full of TreasuresHi-5 HouseJar Dwellers SOSJulius Jr.LalaloopsyLittlest Pet Shop (2012 TV series)Mako: Island of SecretsMatt Hatter ChroniclesMia and MeMy Little Pony: Friendship Is Magic (Moved to 9Go!)Pac-Man and the Ghostly AdventuresPokémon: Black & White: Rival DestiniesPokémon: Black & White: Adventures in Unova Pokémon: Black & White: Adventures in Unova and BeyondPokémon The Series XY (Moved to 9Go!)Pokémon The Series XY: Kalos QuestPokémon The Series: XYZPound Puppies (2010)Puppy in My Pocket: Adventures in PocketvilleRat-A-TatRedakai: Conquer the KairuRedakai: Lokar's ShadowRekkit RabbitScaredy SquirrelScopeSidekickSlugterraStrawberry Shortcake's Berry Bitty AdventuresSuper Wings (Moved to 9Go!)Teenage Mutant Ninja Turtles (2012)The Amazing Spiez!The Treasure IslandTickety TocTotally SpiesTotally WildTransformers: Prime Transformers: Rescue Bots (Moved to 9Go!)Transformers: Robots in DisguiseTree Fu TomVic the Viking (Moved to ABC ME)WakfuMovies and specialsBarbie: Dreamtopia Invizimals: Tale of Two Dimensions Invizimals: The Alliance Monster HighMy Little Pony: Equestria GirlsMy Little Pony: Equestria Girls – Friendship GamesMy Little Pony: Equestria Girls – Legend of EverfreeMy Little Pony: Equestria Girls – Rainbow RocksPac-Man: Santa Pac's Merry Berry Day Pac's Scary Halloween Special Pokémon the Movie: Black—Victini and Reshiram and White—Victini and Zekrom Pokémon the Movie: Diancie and the Cocoon of DestructionPokémon the Movie: Genesect and the Legend AwakenedPokémon the Movie: Hoopa and the Clash of AgesPokémon the Movie: Kyurem vs. the Sword of JusticePokémon the Movie: Volcanion and the Mechanical MarvelPokémon: Zoroark: Master of IllusionsTeam Hot Wheels: Build the Epic RaceTeam Hot Wheels: Origins of AwesomeTeam Hot Wheels: Skills To ThrillTransformers Prime Beast Hunters: Predacons RisingSee also
Dan Sweetman
Pip Russell
Kellyn MorrisScope (Australian TV series)Cheez TV''

References

External links
Toasted TV Official website

Television programming blocks in Australia
Network 10 original programming
10 Peach original programming
Australian children's television series
Television shows set in Gold Coast, Queensland
Television shows set in Brisbane
2005 Australian television series debuts
2020 Australian television series endings
2010s Australian television series
English-language television shows